The Louisiana and Delta Railroad  is a short-line railroad headquartered in New Iberia, Louisiana.

LDRR operates over 114 miles of branch line in southern Louisiana between Lafayette, Louisiana and Raceland, Louisiana, with most of the lines near US 90.  LDRR operates via trackage rights on the BNSF Railway. LDRR traffic generally consists of bauxite ore, carbon black, fertilizer, molasses, oilfield supplies, paper products, pipe, sugar and rice.

The railroad's current headquarters is at New Iberia station, formerly the Southern Pacific train station. There, you can find the building, a small yard, and further down a siding, the Locomotive Workshop.

The lines were built between 1880 and 1890.  LDRR started in 1987 with the sale of seven Southern Pacific lines to Genesee and Wyoming. It has an all EMD locomotive fleet. EMD CF7s, GP10s, GP10-1s, GP38-2s, a single SW1200, a GP38, and a GP8 make up their active roster. As of July 2021, the roster is made up of 1 GP15-1 (1536), 7 GP10-1s (1702, 1703, 1707, 1708, 1709, 1850, and 1852), 3 GP8s (1710, 1712, and 1717), and 2 GP18-1s (1846 and 1847). Plus, 2 CF7s (1500 and 1504), are at the shops, with 1500 being in decent condition, and 1504 having its carbody and engine removed, plus other parts.

External links

 Louisiana and Delta Railroad official webpage - Genesee and Wyoming website
 Link to Union Pacific Website with LDRR Details
 The Louisiana & Delta in Daylon (Railroad Pictures Archive)
 The Louisiana & Delta in Raceland, Louisiana; May 19, 2004 (RailPictures.net)
 HawkinsRails.net - Louisiana & Delta
The Louisiana & Delta Collection (Railroad Pictures Archive)

Louisiana railroads
Genesee & Wyoming
Spin-offs of the Southern Pacific Transportation Company